{{Infobox book | 
| name = Sisterhood Is Forever: The Women's Anthology for a New Millennium
| image = File:Sisterhood is Forever.jpg
| caption = First edition
| editor = Robin Morgan
| country = United States
| language = English
| subject = Second-wave feminism
| publisher = Washington Square Press
| pub_date = 2003
| media_type = Print (Paperback)
| pages = 580
| preceded_by = Sisterhood Is Global: The International Women's Movement Anthology (1984)
| followed_by =
| isbn = 978-0743466271
| oclc = 51854519
}}Sisterhood Is Forever: The Women's Anthology for a New Millennium is a 2003 anthology of feminist writings edited by Robin Morgan. It has more than fifty women contributing sixty original essays written specifically for it. It is the follow-up anthology to Sisterhood Is Global: The International Women's Movement Anthology (1984), which itself is the follow-up to Sisterhood Is Powerful: An Anthology of Writings from the Women's Liberation Movement (1970).

ContentsSisterhood Is Forever shows the reader feminism's emphases and accomplishments as of 2003. Essays range in tone from scholarly to narrative and provide both conservative and liberal view points. The focus is on feminism in the United States. The book addresses why feminism is still needed in the 21st century, providing "alarming" statistics about the status of women in the United States in Morgan's introduction.

ReceptionSisterhood Is Forever was considered "multifaceted and compelling" by Publishers Weekly. According to reviewer Kathy Davis, Robin Morgan's touch can be seen throughout the book, showing a clear sense of vision through her choices of essays and her footnotes. While some critics felt that focusing on the U.S. was "problematic," others felt that it made sense, especially in the wake of 9/11.

In popular culture
In a 2019 Paris Fashion Week show, Christian Dior's creative director Maria Grazia Chiuri debuted a collection of T-shirts that read Sisterhood Is Powerful, Sisterhood Is Global, and Sisterhood Is Forever'', respectively.

References

External links
 Sisterhood Is Forever

2003 non-fiction books
American anthologies
Books edited by Robin Morgan
English-language books
Radical feminist books
Second-wave feminism